Colletotrichum hanaui is a falcate-spored graminicolous plant pathogenic fungi species, first isolated from warm-season grasses.

References

Further reading
Crouch, Jo Anne, et al. "Anthracnose disease of switchgrass caused by the novel fungal species Colletotrichum navitas." Mycological research 113.12 (2009): 1411–1421.
ZHANG, Yong, et al. "Cloning and sequence analysis of three Gα subunit genes from Colletotrichum hanaui." Acta Agriculturae Zhejiangensis 6 (2010): 003.
Qiu, H. P., et al. "First Report of Anthracnose of Digitaria sanguinalis Caused by Colletotrichum hanaui in China." Plant Disease 94.12 (2010): 1510–1510.

External links

MycoBank

hanaui
Fungi described in 2009